This is a list of general topology topics, by Wikipedia page.

Basic concepts

Topological space
Topological property
Open set, closed set
Clopen set
Closure (topology)
Boundary (topology)
Dense (topology)
G-delta set, F-sigma set
closeness (mathematics)
neighbourhood (mathematics)
Continuity (topology)
Homeomorphism
Local homeomorphism
Open and closed maps
Germ (mathematics)
Base (topology), subbase
Open cover
Covering space
Atlas (topology)

Limits

Limit point
Net (topology)
Filter (topology)
Ultrafilter

Topological properties

Baire category theorem
Nowhere dense
Baire space
Banach–Mazur game
Meagre set
Comeagre set

Compactness and countability

Compact space
Relatively compact subspace
Heine–Borel theorem
Tychonoff's theorem
Finite intersection property
Compactification
Measure of non-compactness
Paracompact space
Locally compact space
Compactly generated space
Axiom of countability
Sequential space
First-countable space
Second-countable space
Separable space
Lindelöf space
Sigma-compact space

Connectedness

Connected space

Separation axioms

T0 space
T1 space
Hausdorff space
Completely Hausdorff space
Regular space
Tychonoff space
Normal space
Urysohn's lemma
Tietze extension theorem
Paracompact
Separated sets

Topological constructions

Direct sum and the dual construction product
Subspace and the dual construction quotient
Topological tensor product

Examples

Discrete space
Locally constant function
Trivial topology
Cofinite topology
Finer topology
Product topology
Restricted product
Quotient space
Unit interval
Continuum (topology)
Extended real number line
Long line (topology)
Sierpinski space
Cantor set, Cantor space, Cantor cube
Space-filling curve
Topologist's sine curve
Uniform norm
Weak topology
Strong topology
Hilbert cube
Lower limit topology
Sorgenfrey plane
Real tree
Compact-open topology
Zariski topology
Kuratowski closure axioms
Unicoherent
Solenoid (mathematics)

Uniform spaces

Uniform continuity
Lipschitz continuity
Uniform isomorphism
Uniform property
Uniformly connected space

Metric spaces

Metric topology
Manhattan distance
Ultrametric space
P-adic numbers, p-adic analysis
Open ball
Bounded subset
Pointwise convergence
Metrization theorems
Complete space
Cauchy sequence
Banach fixed-point theorem
Polish space
Hausdorff distance
Intrinsic metric
Category of metric spaces

Topology and order theory
Stone duality
Stone's representation theorem for Boolean algebras
Specialization (pre)order
Sober space
Spectral space
Alexandrov topology
Upper topology
Scott topology
Scott continuity
Lawson topology

Descriptive set theory

 Polish Space
 Cantor space

Dimension theory

Inductive dimension
Lebesgue covering dimension
Lebesgue's number lemma

Combinatorial topology

Polytope
Simplex
Simplicial complex
CW complex
Manifold
Triangulation
Barycentric subdivision
Sperner's lemma
Simplicial approximation theorem
Nerve of an open covering

Foundations of algebraic topology

Simply connected
Semi-locally simply connected
Path (topology)
Homotopy
Homotopy lifting property
Pointed space
Wedge sum
Smash product
Cone (topology)
Adjunction space

Topology and algebra

Topological algebra
Topological group
Topological ring
Topological vector space
Topological module
Topological abelian group
Properly discontinuous
Sheaf space

See also
Topology glossary
List of topology topics
List of geometric topology topics
List of algebraic topology topics
Publications in topology

Mathematics-related lists
Outlines of mathematics and logic
Wikipedia outlines